Inkspell (German title: Tintenblut) is a 2005 young adult fantasy novel by Cornelia Funke. It was named the 2006 Book Sense Book of the Year in the Children's Literature category.

Inkspell is the second novel in Cornelia Funke's Inkheart series. The first novel, Inkheart (2003), was critically acclaimed and was made into a major motion picture released in January 2009. The third novel, Inkdeath, was published on 28 September 2007 in Germany. The audiobook published by Random House Listening Library is read by Brendan Fraser, the actor that played Mo in the movie adaptation. It is approximately 18 hours and 50 minutes long on 16 disks.

While the English title is "Inkspell", the direct German translation would have been "Inkblood". In the third book of the trilogy, the books' names are directly addressed, translating the three regarding words directly (heart, blood, death), and so the connection with the book titles does not appear clearly to the reader.

Plot summary

A year has passed, and Meggie now lives with Elinor, Darius and her parents, Mo and Resa. Life is peaceful, but not a day goes by without Meggie thinking of Inkheart and the characters that came to life. For the fire-eater Dustfinger, the need to return to his home world has become urgent. When he finds a crooked storyteller named Orpheus who has the ability to read and write stories to life like Mo, he asks to be read back. Orpheus obliges but doesn't send Dustfinger's apprentice, Farid, back into the book as they arranged. Instead, Orpheus steals the book from the boy and hands it over to Basta, who wants revenge for the death of his master Capricorn. Distraught, Farid goes in search of Meggie, and before long, both are caught inside the book, too.

Soon after Meggie and Farid are in the book, Mortola, Basta, Orpheus, and a "man built like a wardrobe" barge into Elinor's house, taking Mo, Resa, Elinor, and Darius prisoner. As per Mortola's orders, Orpheus reads Basta, Mortola, and Mo into Inkheart, bringing Resa along by accident. Upon entry, Mortola shoots Mo with a shotgun that he brought from our world. Resa discovers that her voice has come back to her as she prays for Mo to survive the wound. As he recovers, Resa and Mo hide in a secret cave with the strolling players, or the Motley Folk. Soon the Motley Folk assume that the injured Mo is the mysterious gentleman-robber, the "Bluejay", a fictitious hero from a song created by Fenoglio's words. Fenoglio has been living within his own story since the events of Inkheart, working as a court scribe in Lombrica's capital city of Ombra. Once reunited with Meggie, Fenoglio asks her to read Cosimo the Fair back into the story, since he died a death the author never planned for him. Meggie doesn't feel comfortable interfering with the story but is soon convinced by Fenoglio that it will be 'a double' of Cosimo - not Cosimo himself. Reluctantly, Meggie reads Cosmio in and quickly regrets it when the Adderhead's soldiers barge into the fair, injuring and killing many people. Cosimo has none of his doubles memories and doesn't seem to love his wife and child anymore. Cosimo's return upsets the Adderhead, ruler of the neighboring region of Argenta, who planned to take over Lombrica once the Laughing Prince died. With the rightful heir to the throne of Ombra mysteriously brought back to life, but with no memories of 'his own' life, war is imminent.

Mo and Resa are captured by the Adderhead's men along with many other strolling players in the cave, sold out by one of their own. Meggie joins Dustfinger and Farid in searching for her parents and the strolling players. Along with the Black Prince, the leader of the Motley Folk, they launch a successful rescue mission, but Mo is unable to escape because of his wound and Resa stays behind with him. In the meantime, Cosimo's double is ruthlessly killed in a battle along with most of Ombra's men. Meggie goes willingly into the Adderhead's Castle of Night and, fulfilling a prophecy she and Fenoglio dreamed up and "read" into reality, offers him a bargain: Mo, a great bookbinder, rather than the robber they believe him to be, will bind the Adderhead a book of immortality if he lets Meggie, Resa, Mo, and the rest go free. What they neglect to tell the Prince of Argenta is that if three words are written in the book ("Heart", "Spell", and "Death", referencing the titles of the books), the person who signed his name in the book to gain immortality will die instantly. In disbelief, his lieutenant Firefox, is chosen to test it. Firefox is made immortal, surviving a fatal stabbing without suffering any consequences but Taddeo, the Adderhead's librarian, kills him by writing the three words in the book. Satisfied that the book works, the words are erased and replaced by the Adderhead's name, consequently making the Adderhead invincible. Mo picks up Firefox's sword as they leave and claims it as his own, feeling a strange coldness within him; he believes his anger and sadness at the events thus far are changing him into a different person.

The Adderhead decided, as celebration for his wife giving birth to a healthy son to release all of the prisoners from his cells, but the Black Prince suspects that he instead plans to sell the prisoners into slavery. Together the robbers plan to free the prisoners. Mo learns to fight during the raid lead by Basta. Unfortunately Basta kills Farid with a knife thrown at his back (The death Fenoglio had originally planned for Dustfinger). Basta is then killed by Mo.

Later while mourning Farid's death, Dustfinger asks Meggie if she too would like to have Farid back. When Meggie agrees, he sends her to Roxanne to tell her "he will always find his way back to her". Roxanne realizes what Dustfinger plans to do and runs to him but is too late and watches as the White Women, (the Inkworld's Angels of Death) take Dustfinger.  Farid is brought back to life in Dustfinger's place and the story ends with Meggie reading Orpheus to the Inkworld so as to resurrect Dustfinger. Orpheus convinces Farid to become his servant in saying that it will help him bring Dustfinger back to life.

References

2005 German novels
German fantasy novels
Inkheart trilogy books
2005 fantasy novels
German children's novels
2005 children's books